Kanodia Purohitan is a panchayat village in the Indian state of Rajasthan. It is situated on Jaisalmer Highway (NH-125), 120 km from Jodhpur.

History 
It is one of the oldest villages of the Rajpurohits. Historically, it was awarded to Dharayatji Rajpurohit. Prior to 2009, Kanodia was part of ILRC Balesar within Shergarh tehsil.

Newer villages include Chatar Singh nagar and Tikam Singh nagarHastinapur (named for late Hasti singh Rajpurohit) and Shree Ratneshwar Nagar (named for Jhunjaar Shree Dadosa Ratan Singh Ji).

Economy 
It is a three-crop village. Half of the population is engaged in agriculture, and the rest are either in the armed forces or in business.

Geography 
It is surrounded by sand dunes with much greenery.

Kanodia is divided into three parts, one each for Dedaji, Raghoji and Netoji.

Religion 
Dadoji Ratan Singhji Jhunjharji temple is owned by the whole village and is worshiped by all castes. Major decisions are made there, and on every Holi and Diwali, the whole village gathers. 

A society named Bothiya Nagar is nearby.

Demographics 
In the 2001 census, the village of Kanodiya Purohitan had 3,862 inhabitants, with 2,028 males (52.5%) and 1,834 females (47.5%), for a sex ratio of 904 females per thousand males.

Notes

Villages in Jodhpur district